Wade Scott is an American college basketball coach, who most recently served as the Women's Head Coach at Texas A&M University–Kingsville in Kingsville, Texas from 2014 to 2019. He was previously the interim head coach at the University of Houston after being an assistant coach for several years. He has also coached on the junior college and high school levels.

Head coaching record

References

Living people
Houston Cougars women's basketball coaches
Year of birth missing (living people)
Texas A&M–Kingsville Javelinas coaches